The 1876 Spanish general election was held from Thursday, 20 January to Sunday, 23 January 1876 (for the Congress of Deputies) and from Tuesday, 1 February to Friday, 4 February 1876 (for the Senate), to elect the Constituent Restoration Cortes of the Kingdom of Spain. All 406 seats in the Congress of Deputies were up for election, as well as all 196 seats in the Senate. In the Canary Islands the election was held from 28 to 31 January, and in Puerto Rico it was held from 15 to 18 February. On 5 April 1877, another election to the Senate was held.

This was the first election to be held after the end of the First Spanish Republic in 1874. The Third Carlist War and the Ten Years' War were still unraveling at the time, meaning that elections were not held in some districts (namely, those in the Captaincy General of Cuba). The newly-founded Liberal Conservative Party of incumbent prime minister Antonio Cánovas del Castillo won an overall majority of seats, paving the way for the adoption of the Spanish Constitution of 1876, which would mark the starting point of the Bourbon Restoration that would last until 1931.

Overview

Electoral system
The Spanish Cortes were envisaged as "co-legislative bodies", based on a nearly perfect bicameralism. Both the Congress of Deputies and the Senate had legislative, control and budgetary functions, sharing equal powers except for laws on contributions or public credit, where the Congress had preeminence. Voting for the Cortes was on the basis of universal manhood suffrage, which comprised all national males over 21 years of age and in full enjoyment of their civil rights.

For the 1876 election, the laws of the First Spanish Republic remained in force, including the provisions for both the Congress and Senate within the Spanish Constitution of 1869. As a result, the original electoral law of 1870 was applied, without including the changes introduced by the 1873 amendments. The electorate consisted of 3,989,612 electors, about a 24.0% of the country population.

For the Congress of Deputies, 391 seats were elected using the first-past-the-post method under a one-round system. Candidates winning a plurality in each constituency were elected. The provinces of Spain were divided into single-member districts, with each province entitled to one district per each 40,000 inhabitants or fraction greater than 20,000. The law also provided for by-elections to fill seats vacated throughout the legislature.

For the Senate, 196 seats were indirectly elected, with electors voting for delegates instead of senators. Elected delegates—equivalent in number to one-sixth of the councillors in each municipal corporation—would then vote for senators using a write-in, two-round majority voting system, with each province being allocated four seats.

Election date
The term of each House of the Cortes—the Congress and one-quarter of the Senate—expired three years from the date of their previous election, unless they were dissolved earlier. The Monarch had the prerogative to dissolve both Houses at any given time—either jointly or separately—and call a snap election.

Background
The pronunciamiento—a military coup—of Arsenio Martínez Campos on 29 December 1874 put an end to the First Spanish Republic and hastened the restoration of the Bourbon monarchy in the figure of Alfonso XII, son of former Queen Isabel II. An interim government led by Cánovas del Castillo was confirmed by King Alfonso XII upon disembarking in Barcelona on 9 January 1875.

Results

Congress of Deputies

Notes

References

Bibliography

External links
Historical archive of deputies (1810–1977) from www.congreso.es, the official Congress of Deputies web portal (in Spanish)
Elections in the Sexenio Revolucionario and the Restoration at www.historiaelectoral.com (in Spanish/Catalan)

1876 elections in Spain
1876 in Spain
1876
January 1876 events